Raffaello Vanni (1590 ca-1673) was an Italian painter of the Baroque.

Biography 
He was born at Siena. He first trained with his father, Francesco Vanni, who died in 1610.  He was afterwards sent to Rome, and recommended to the care of Antonio Carracci.  He became a follower of the style of Pietro da Cortona. He painted a  Birth of the Virgin for Santa Maria della Pace. He also painted two lunette paintings for Santa Maria del Popolo representing The royal ancestors of the Virgin and The sacerdotal ancestors of the Virgin in 1653. These oil on wood panels were placed above the tombs of Agostino and Sigismondo Chigi in the Chigi Chapel. A Marriage of S. Catharine by him is in the Pitti Palace, and other pictures at Siena and Pisa. He was a member of the Accademia di San Luca in 1655. His brother, Michelangelo Vanni, is better known as the inventor of a process of making pictures by staining marble than as an artist. One of Raffaello's pupils was Deifebo Burbarini.

References

Bibliography

1590 births
1657 deaths
17th-century Italian painters
Italian male painters
Painters from Siena
Italian Baroque painters